The 1899 Clackmannanshire and Kinross-shire by-election was a parliamentary by-election held for the British House of Commons constituency of Clackmannanshire and Kinross-shire on 20 December 1899. The seat had become vacant when the sitting Liberal Member of Parliament John Balfour resigned having been appointed a judge.

The Liberal candidate, Eugene Wason, the former MP for South Ayrshire won the seat in a straight fight with his Conservative opponent George Younger.

The result

References

See also
 List of United Kingdom by-elections (1885–1900)

1899 elections in the United Kingdom
1899 in Scotland
1890s elections in Scotland
By-elections to the Parliament of the United Kingdom in Scottish constituencies
19th century in Clackmannanshire
Politics of Clackmannanshire